Unicon was an annual science fiction convention held in Maryland and at least once in Washington, D.C. from 1975 through 1989.

Unicon was born in the early 1970s on the second floor of the Stamp Student Union building at the University of Maryland, College Park. Unicon stood for University Convention. The University of Maryland Science Fiction Club was the organizing body. The club originally began as an open university course on science fiction with Stephen Rynas, a university junior, as the instructor.

Unicon I was held at the Interstate Inn on Route 1 in College Park. The Guest of Honor was Frederik Pohl.

Unicon outgrew any facilities in College Park and moved to the Silver Spring Sheraton (now a Hilton, where four Capclaves were held) for a successful run into the 1980s.

List of Unicons

References 
 Don Sakers' con reports at 
 Various WSFA Journals, all available online at 
 Personal communication from Erwin Strauss, Simcha Kuritzky, Don Sakers, and Fred Blonder
 "Science Fiction Topic of Two-Day Conference," "Baltimore Sun", July 5, 1976, p. B2
 "The Falcon, Chewbacca and 1,202 Humanoids", by Joseph McLellan, Washington Post, Monday, July 10, 1978, p. B1, B9

Defunct science fiction conventions in the United States
Recurring events established in 1975
Recurring events disestablished in 1989
1975 establishments in Maryland
1989 disestablishments in Maryland